Dehati Disco is a 2022 Indian Hindi-language dance film directed by Manoj Sharma and produced by Vaseem Qureshi, Gitesh Chandrakar, Kamal Kishor Mishra under the banner of Qureshi Productions Private Limited. The film revolves around the youth of the country who really enjoy dancing. Bollywood choreographer Ganesh Acharya plays the lead in the film.

Plot

Cast
Ganesh Acharya
Ravi Kishan
Manoj Joshi
Rajesh Sharma
Remo D'Souza (guest appearance)
Sunil Pal
Sahil Khan
Saksham Sharma

Production
The film was announced with the released the official poster on 16 October 2020, while principal photography started on 25 October in Lucknow, Uttar Pradesh.

Release 
The film was released theatrically on 27 May 2022.

Music
The music rights of the film are owned by T Series. The music of the film is composed by Drums Shivamani.

Reception

References

External links 
 
 

Films shot in Lucknow
2020s dance films
Indian dance films
Indian children's films
Films directed by Manoj Sharma